Indravasu (Kharosthi: 𐨀𐨁𐨎𐨡𐨿𐨪𐨬𐨯𐨂 , ;ruled circa 15 CE) was an Indo-Scythian king of the Apracas in Bajaur, western Pakistan.

Rukhana reliquary

He is mentioned in a recently discovered inscription in Kharoshthi on a Buddhist reliquary  (the "Rukhana reliquary", published by Salomon in 2005), which gives a relationship between several eras of the period, and especially gives confirmation of a Yavana era in relation to the Azes era. He was the son of king Vijayamitra.

Silver Buddhist reliquary of Prince Indravarma

He is also mentioned as king of the Apracas on another inscription:

Notes

References
Baums, Stefan. 2012. “Catalog and Revised Texts and Translations of Gandharan Reliquary Inscriptions.” In: David Jongeward, Elizabeth Errington, Richard Salomon and Stefan Baums, Gandharan Buddhist Reliquaries, p. 212–213, 233–234, Seattle: Early Buddhist Manuscripts Project (Gandharan Studies, Volume 1).
Baums, Stefan, and Andrew Glass. 2002– . Catalog of Gāndhārī Texts, nos. CKI 241 and CKI 405

Ancient history of Pakistan
History of Pakistan
Indo-Scythian kings
1st-century BC Iranian monarchs
1st-century monarchs in Asia